Tony Ifeanyichukwu Ezenna (born 21 April 1957) is a Nigerian businessman and philanthropist. He was the founder of Orange Drugs Nigeria Limited, a company that specializes in the distribution of pharmaceutical and beauty products from Indonesia, Germany, Italy, and the United States to Nigeria.

Early life
Ezenna was born in Port Harcourt, River State, Nigeria, where he grew up before moving to Onitsha. He attended St. David primary school in Owerre Akokwa, followed by Christ the King College, Onitsha for his high school education. He later paused his education due to financial hardship and joined his father's business.

Personal life
He is married to Elizabeth Ezenna and is a devout Christian.

References 

Businesspeople from Port Harcourt
Nigerian philanthropists
1957 births
Living people
Nigerian company founders
Officers of the Order of the Niger